Adesmobathra is a monotypic moth genus in the family Geometridae. Its only species, Adesmobathra ozoloides, is found in Tanzania. Both the genus and species were first described by Prout in 1916.

References

Endemic fauna of Tanzania
Oenochrominae
Geometridae genera
Monotypic moth genera